Luis Maravilla (Luis López Tejera) (1 June 1914 – 10 July 2000) was a Flamenco composer. He was born in Seville, Spain.

Maravilla studied guitar under Marcelo Molina and Pepe de Badajoz, and debuted professionally at the age of 12 in the Pavon Theatre of Seville. In the 1930s he toured much of North and South America. The Spanish Civil War brought him to France. Returning to Spain in 1940, he performed with such troupes as Gracia de Triana and Estrellita Castro. Maravilla retired in 1957 to begin teaching.

External links
Luis Maravilla, Google books
Saturday review, Volume 36
Oxford notes Music Library Association
Biography of Luis Maravilla 

1914 births
2000 deaths
Spanish flamenco guitarists
Spanish male guitarists
People from Seville
Spanish composers
Spanish male composers
20th-century composers
20th-century Spanish musicians
Flamenco guitarists
20th-century guitarists
20th-century Spanish male musicians